Rhysodromus alascensis is a species of running crab spider in the family Philodromidae. It is found in North America, Russia (Sibiria), Kazakhstan, and China.

References

Philodromidae
Spiders described in 1884